Taurus Nunataks is a line of three nunataks running east–west, with only the outer two of any prominence, located 23 nautical miles (43 km) east-northeast of Gurney Point in Palmer Land. Named by United Kingdom Antarctic Place-Names Committee (UK-APC) after the constellation of Taurus.

Nunataks of Palmer Land